Encore (stylized as ƎNCORE) is the fifth studio album by American rapper Eminem. It was released on November 12, 2004, by Aftermath Entertainment, Shady Records, and Interscope Records. Its release date was originally set for November 16, 2004, but Eminem moved the release date to five days earlier after the album was leaked to the internet. As reflected on the album cover—Eminem taking a bow—the album was widely considered to be Eminem's final album of new material.

The album contains several lyrical themes, most notably Eminem's opposition to then-US president George W. Bush and a parody towards Michael Jackson. The album features more comedic themes and lyrics than Eminem's previous albums.

Critical reception of Encore was less favorable than Eminem's previous albums, with most of the second half being heavily criticized for its lackluster quality and lack of lyrical content, though "Mockingbird" and "Like Toy Soldiers" were particularly highly praised and retrospectively have been noted as being some of Eminem's best songs. The album has sold 11 million copies worldwide and was certified quadruple platinum by the Recording Industry Association of America (RIAA) on December 17, 2004.

Encore provoked some controversy over anti-Bush lyrics and lyrics that parodied and targeted Jackson, who was upset about Eminem's depiction of him in the video for "Just Lose It". Retrospectively, Encore is often considered to be one of Eminem's two worst albums alongside Revival.

Artwork and packaging 
The album featured two covers, the first cover features Eminem standing in front of an audience, bowing to the crowd. The tray insert features Eminem holding a gun behind his back. The inlay shows Eminem holding the pistol in his mouth without the jacket of his shirt and tie. The CD itself shows a note written by Eminem saying "To my family & all my friends, thank you for everything, I will always love you. To my fans, I'm Sorry, Marshall" with a bullet underneath the note. The note is also seen in the album's booklet, where Eminem is writing the note. Some pictures show Eminem shooting everybody, which makes a reference to the ending of the album's title track. The second cover features the same audience from the inlay on a black background with a blood splat on the top right. This cover is used for the Shady Collector's Edition.

Critical reception 

Encore received generally positive reviews from critics, but received more of a negative response compared to his past three albums. At Metacritic, which assigns a normalized rating out of 100 to reviews from mainstream publications, the album received an average score of 64, based on 26 reviews. Josh Love from Stylus Magazine felt Eminem was "dying" with this album, whose concept was "end-to-end mea culpa", full of "clarifications, rectifications and excuses", revising the history of "a man who knows he doesn't have much time left". Scott Plangenhoef, writing for Pitchfork Media called Encore a "transitional record" and "the sound of a man who seems bored of re-branding and playing celebrity games". BBC Music's Adam Webb believed it starts "fantastically" but ends "abominably", writing that it has too many "low points". David Browne from Entertainment Weekly said Eminem "sacrifices the rich, multi-textured productions" of his two previous albums for "thug-life monotony, cultural zingers for petty music-biz score-settling, and probing self-analysis for juvenile humor". He concluded his review by saying that Eminem has become "predictable" on Encore, something that he wasn't before.

Stephen Thomas Erlewine was more enthusiastic in his review for AllMusic, calling the music "spartan", built on "simple unadorned beats and keyboard loops", and the lyrics "plain-spoken and literal". Robert Christgau said Eminem still sounded "funny, catchy and clever, and irreverent past his allotted time", noting that even the bonus tracks "keep on pushing". In Rolling Stone, he wrote that Encore was not as "astonishing" as The Marshall Mathers LP, but praised Eminem for maturing his lyrical abilities while retaining his sense of humor. Steve Jones from USA Today also spoke positively about the album, calling Eminem's producing and lyrical skills as "top-flight" and noting that the record explores "the many sides of Marshall Mathers". The album earned Eminem Grammy Award nominations in three categories at the 48th Annual Grammy Awards: Best Rap Album, Best Rap Performance by a Duo or Group for the song "Encore", and Best Rap Solo Performance for the song "Mockingbird".

Encore provoked some controversy over anti-Bush lyrics and lyrics that parodied and targeted Michael Jackson, who was upset about Eminem's depiction of him in the video for "Just Lose It". On December 8, 2003, the United States Secret Service admitted it was "looking into" allegations that Eminem had threatened the President of the United States, George Bush, after the song "We as Americans", as an unreleased bootleg, circulated with the lyrics "Fuck money, I don't rap for dead presidents. I'd rather see the president dead." This line was eventually used as a sample in Immortal Technique's single "Bin Laden", which featured Mos Def and Chuck D. The incident was later referenced in the video for his song "Mosh" as one several news clips on a wall, along with other newspaper articles about other unfortunate incidents in Bush's career. The song eventually appeared on the album's bonus disc, with the word "dead" being reversed.

About the album's reception, Eminem said: "I'm cool with probably half that album. I recorded that towards the height of my addiction. I remember four songs leaked and I had to go to L.A. and get Dre and record new ones. I was in a room by myself writing songs in 25, 30 minutes because we had to get it done, and what came out was so goofy. That's how I ended up making songs like 'Rain Man' and 'Big Weenie'. They're pretty out there. If those other songs hadn't leaked, Encore would've been a different album." In the Kamikaze interview he did with Sway Calloway, although he stated that "Encore... [is] not what I would consider one of my better albums", in the same interview, he considered it better than its follow-up Relapse. He reiterates his statement about Encore in 2022 for the XXL's 25th anniversary issue and singled out the album as his first «misstep»: "It became a misstep and I struggled to get over the fact that I didn't do my best. My best would've been good enough if the leaks hadn't happened. But I released what I had at that point in time, and I feel that put a kind of a mark on my catalog. Encore did some decent numbers, but I was never that concerned with numbers. I was more so worried about what people think about the album. Critics and fans were important to me, and they were always at me about that project."

Commercial performance 
Encore was pushed up to a midweek release to combat leaks. Regardless, it sold 710,000 copies with only three days of sales. The following week, the album's first with a full seven days, it moved 871,000 copies, bringing the 10 day total to 1,582,000. It was certified quadruple-platinum that mid-December. Nine months after its release, worldwide sales of the album stood at 11 million copies. The album made digital history in becoming the first album to sell 10,000 digital copies in one week. As of November 2013, the album had sold 5,343,000 copies in the US.

Encore sold 125,000 copies in two days in the United Kingdom, and has been certified quadruple-platinum.

Track listing 

Notes
 signifies an additional producer.
 "Love You More" and the original version of "We As Americans" were leaked in 2003.
 Dr. Dre has cameo appearances in "Rain Man", "Just Lose It", "Ass Like That".
 Like Toy Soldiers features uncredited sample of Martika from her 1989 song "Toy Soldiers".
 Crazy In Love features uncredited sample of Ann Wilson from Heart's 1976 song "Crazy on You".
 "Curtains Down" is a skit at the end of "Encore", in which Eminem shoots everyone at his concert and then shoots himself, followed by a robotic voice saying "See you in hell, fuckers". Some of the pictures in the booklet make reference to this.
 The robotic voice heard on "Em Calls Paul" and in the "Curtains Down" skit is Eminem speaking with an electrolarynx.

Personnel 
Credits are adapted from the album's liner notes.
 Mike Elizondo – keyboards (tracks: 2, 3, 6, 10, 11, 13, 14 and 20); guitar (tracks 6, 11, 13 and 20); sitar (track 14)
 Steve King – guitar (tracks: 4, 5, 7, 15, 17 and 18); bass (tracks: 4, 5, 7 and 17); mandolin (track 4); keyboards (track 11)
 Luis Resto – keyboards (tracks: 2, 4, 5, 7, 8, 15, 16, 17, 18 and 20)
 Mark Batson – keyboards on (tracks: 2, 6, 10, 11, 13 and 20); bass on (track 14)
 Che Vicious – programming (track 20)

Charts

Weekly charts

Year-end charts

Decade-end charts

Certifications

References 

2004 albums
Eminem albums
Aftermath Entertainment albums
Albums produced by Dr. Dre
Albums produced by Eminem
Albums produced by Mark Batson
Albums produced by Mike Elizondo
Interscope Records albums
Shady Records albums
Interscope Geffen A&M Records albums
Comedy hip hop albums